Beáta Hoffmann (born 22 June 1967 in Győr) is a former Hungarian handball goalkeeper, World Championship silver medalist and Olympic bronze medalist.

References

1967 births
Living people
Sportspeople from Győr
Hungarian female handball players
Olympic handball players of Hungary
Handball players at the 1996 Summer Olympics
Olympic bronze medalists for Hungary
Olympic medalists in handball
Medalists at the 1996 Summer Olympics